Leandro Fabián Palladino (born January 13, 1976) is a retired Argentine-Italian professional basketball player.

Professional career 
In his pro career, Palladino played in the Argentine League, the Spanish League, the Italian League, and the EuroLeague.

National team career
Palladino was a member of the senior men's Argentine national team. With them he won a silver medal at the 2002 FIBA World Championship.

References

External links
Euroleague.net Profile
LatinBasket.com Profile
ACB.com Profile 
Legabasket.it Profile 

1976 births
Living people
2002 FIBA World Championship players
Argentine expatriate basketball people in Bulgaria
Argentine expatriate basketball people in Spain
Argentine expatriate sportspeople in Italy
Argentine men's basketball players
Argentine people of Italian descent
Atenas basketball players
Basket Napoli players
Ben Hur basketball players
Boca Juniors basketball players
Italian expatriate basketball people in Spain
Italian men's basketball players
Liga ACB players
PBC CSKA Moscow players
People from Uruguay Department
Saski Baskonia players
Shooting guards
Small forwards
Tenerife CB players
Viola Reggio Calabria players
Sportspeople from Entre Ríos Province